Barry Andrews (born 16 May 1967) is an Irish politician who serves as a Member of the European Parliament (MEP) for the Dublin constituency. He is a member of Fianna Fáil, part of Renew Europe. He previously served as Minister of State for Children from 2008 to 2011. He was a Teachta Dála (TD) for the Dún Laoghaire constituency from 2002 to 2011.

The Andrews family have a long connection with Fianna Fáil. Before entering political life, Andrews was a secondary school teacher. He was the Director-General of the Dublin-based Institute of International and European Affairs (IIEA), a partly Irish State-funded EU think tank, since 2017. He was CEO of GOAL from 2012 to 2016, during which the agency grew from a turnover of €60m to more than €150m. He announced his resignation to allow for ‘a fresh start in terms of leadership’ in October 2016 in the wake of a fraud in the charity that was discovered in March 2016.

Early career and personal life
He was born in Dublin and was educated at Blackrock College and University College Dublin (UCD), where he received a Bachelor of Arts degree in English and Philosophy in 1988, and a Masters of Arts in Modern History in 1990. He worked as a secondary school teacher in Dublin from 1991 until 1997, working in Ballyfermot Senior College, Sutton Park School and Bruce College. While a secondary school teacher, he studied law at King's Inns and qualified as a barrister in 1997. He was called to the Bar in 1997 and practised as a barrister until 2003. He is married and has one son. His brother, David McSavage is a comedian, and he is a first cousin of RTÉ television and radio presenter Ryan Tubridy.

Political career
Andrews was first elected to public office in the June 1999 local elections as a Dún Laoghaire–Rathdown County Councillor. He was elected to Dáil Éireann at the 2002 general election. Andrews comes from a family with strong political connections. His grandfather, Todd Andrews, fought in the War of Independence and became a founder-member of Fianna Fáil, and his grandmother, Mary Coyle, was a member of Cumann na mBan. Andrews's father, David Andrews served as a TD from 1965 to 2002 and is a former Foreign Minister, while his uncle, Niall Andrews, was a former Fianna Fáil TD and MEP and his cousin, Chris Andrews (son of Niall Andrews), has been a Sinn Féin TD since 2020 (having previously served as a Fianna Fáil TD from 2007 to 2011). In April 2018, Andrews was described as "part of Fianna Fáil royalty".

In June 2006, Andrews led a group of Fianna Fáil backbenchers in an unsuccessful attempt to establish a backbench committee to influence government policy. At the 2007 general election, Andrews retained his seat in Dún Laoghaire with 8,587 votes.

Minister of State for Children 
Andrews was appointed Minister of State for Children in May 2008. As Minister, he framed the Government response to the Ryan Report on Institutional Abuse. This included an Implementation Plan that delivered an additional 200 social workers for the HSE Child and Family Services. In April 2009, Andrews introduced the Early Childhood Care and Education (ECCE) Scheme, which provided, for the first time, free universal access to pre-school education. The scheme benefited 65,000 children in 2013.

After the release of the Murphy Report into child abuse in the Dublin diocese in November 2009, Andrews, speaking at a conference in Dublin Castle, said it would be "amazing" if there were no consequences for people who were the subject of adverse findings in the report. Asked about the position of the Bishop of Limerick, Donal Murray, the Minister said, "I think it's everybody's view that if adverse findings are made against an individual in a commission of inquiry then it would be amazing that there be no consequences for them.". Bishop Murray subsequently apologised to survivors and resigned from office.

In December 2009, Andrews oversaw the introduction of government policy to lower the legal age of consent to 16. Citing a Joint Oireachtas Committee on the Constitution report which recommended the legal age be reduced to 16 from the current 17. Andrews expressed the view the existing laws were "inappropriate" and out of touch with the modern reality of sexual relations between young people, and promised to publish legislation to change the Age of Consent to 16. He noted that Ireland and Malta were "the only countries in Europe with an age of consent of 17". However, the law was not passed by the Oireachtas before the 2011 Irish general election in which Fianna Fáil ceded power to a Fine Gael-Labour coalition.

On 31 January 2011, in the run up to the general election, Andrews was named Health spokesman by the party leader, Micheál Martin. He lost his seat at the general election. For his eight years' service as a TD, Andrews was entitled to a lump sum of €110,312, a partial TD's pension between the ages of 45 and 49 (which he has not claimed), and beginning at age 50 a full pension of approximately €16,000 per year. He is entitled to a ministerial pension of approximately €9,000 from the age of 65.

Children's Referendum
In September 2012, he was appointed Fianna Fáil Director of Elections for the Children's referendum.

2019 European Parliament election
In February 2019, he was selected as the Fianna Fáil candidate for the Dublin constituency at the 2019 European Parliament election. He was elected in May 2019 receiving 14.1% of the 1st preference votes, but as the fourth candidate elected he did not take his seat until after the UK left the European Union on 31 January 2020.

Non-political career

In November 2012, Andrews was appointed chief executive of the Irish aid charity GOAL, replacing the retiring founder John O'Shea. In October 2016, Andrews resigned from GOAL after it was revealed that other senior executives of Goal had been involved in "large-scale fraud", though there was no suggestion that he himself was involved in the scandal. In October 2017, the new CEO of GOAL announced a deficit of €31.6 million due to the fraud but said that it would survive after "one of the most challenging years" in its 40-year history.

In March 2017, Andrews was appointed as Director-General of the Irish State-supported EU think tank and advocacy body, the Institute of International and European Affairs (IIEA), with the Chairperson of the IIEA, former Leader of the Labour Party, Ruairi Quinn, describing Andrews as having the "political and administrative skills" of value to the IIEA.

See also
Families in the Oireachtas
Institute of International and European Affairs

References

External links

Barry Andrews' page on the Fianna Fáil website

1967 births
Living people
Alumni of University College Dublin
Barry
Fianna Fáil TDs
Irish barristers
Irish schoolteachers
Local councillors in Dún Laoghaire–Rathdown
Members of the 29th Dáil
Members of the 30th Dáil
Ministers of State of the 30th Dáil
People educated at Blackrock College
People from Dún Laoghaire
Politicians from County Dublin
Alumni of King's Inns
MEPs for the Republic of Ireland 2019–2024
Fianna Fáil MEPs